Closterkeller is a Polish gothic rock band from Warsaw. It was formed in 1988 by Przemysław Guryń, Jacek Skirucha, and the vocalist Anja Orthodox. Despite many changes in the band's line-up it has created a characteristic sound. Orthodox is the only member of the original line-up, performing continuously for over 30 years. The band is called one of the forerunners of gothic and atmospheric rock in Poland. They are also influenced by other music styles such as new, cold wave, and heavy metal. Many other groups like Delight, Moonlight or Artrosis said they took inspiration from Closterkeller.

Line-up

Current members 

Anja Orthodox – vocals, keyboards (1988–present)
Michał "Rollo" Rollinger – keyboards (1990–present)
Adam "Najman" Najman - drums (2014–present)
Aleksander "Olek" Gruszka – bass guitar (2014–present)
Michał Jarominek – guitars (2016–present)

Former members 
Grzegorz Tomczyk – drums (1988-1989)
Przemysław Guryn – keyboards (1988-1991)
Jacek Skirucha – guitars (1988-1992)
Tomasz "Wolfgang" Grochowalski – bass guitar (1988-1992)
Andrzej "Szczota" Szymańczak (deceased) – drums (1989-1991)
Piotr Bieńkowski – drums (1989-1990)
Marcin "Freddie" Mentel – guitars (1999-2006)
Paweł Pieczyński – guitars (1992-2000)
Robert Ochnio – guitars (1992)
Marcin "Pucek" Płuciennik – bass guitar (1999-2006)
Piotr "Pawłoś" Pawłowski – drums (1991-1997)
Dariusz Boral – keyboards (1995-1996)
Tomasz "Mechu" Wojciechowski – keyboards, guitars (1996-1998)
Andrzej Kaczyński – bass guitar (1999)
Piotr Czyszanowski – bass guitar (1999)
Tomasz Kasprzycki – guitars (1992)
Mikis Cupas – guitars (1991)
Jarosław Kidawa – guitars (1991)
Zbigniew Kumorowski – drums (1990-1991)
Krzysztof Dominik – drums (1989) 
Janusz Jastrzębowski – drums (2006-2011)
Gerard "Gero" Klawe – drums (1997-2006, 2011-2013)
Krzysztof Najman – bass guitar (1992-1999, 2006-2014)
Robert "Qba" Kubajek – drums (2013–2014)
Zuzanna "ZuZa" Jaśkowiak – guitars (2014)
Mariusz Kumala - guitars (2006-2013, 2014-2015)

Timeline

Discography

Studio albums

Compilation albums

Mini-Albums

Live albums

Notes

Video albums

Music videos 
Source

 "Purple" (1990, directed by: Marek Jurkowski)
 "Nieuchwytny" (1990, directed by: Marek Jurkowski)
 "Maska" (1990, directed by: Marek Jurkowski)
 "Czekając na dzień" (1991, directed by: Marek Jurkowski)
 "I jeszcze raz do końca" (1991, directed by: Marek Jurkowski)
 "Immanoleo" (1992, directed by: Marek Jurkowski)
 "Blue" (1992, directed by: Marek Jurkowski)
 "Spokój" (1992, directed by: Marek Jurkowski)
 "Iluzyt" (1992, directed by: Marek Jurkowski)
 "Agnieszka" (1993, directed by: no data)
 "W moim kraju" (1993, realization: Katarzyna Kanclerz)
 "Babeluu" (1994, realization: Katarzyna Kanclerz)
 "Supernova" (1994, realization: TVP)
 "Scarlett" (1995, directed by: Jerzy Grabowski)
 "Owoce wschodu" (1995, directed by: no data)
 "Dlaczego noszę broń" (1995, realization: TVP)
 "Władza" (1996, directed by: no data)
 "Cisza w moim domu" (1996, directed by: no data)
 "Dwa dni" (1997, realization: TVP)
 "Na krawędzi" (1999, directed by: no data)
 "Czas komety" (1999, directed by: no data)
 "Zegarmistrz światła" (2000, directed by: no data)
 "A nadzieja" (2000, production: Krzysztof Wasilewski)
 "Poza granicą dotyku" (2003, directed by / realization: Radek "LarryTM" Grabiński)
 "Ktokolwiek widział" (2004, directed by / realization: Radek "LarryTM" Grabiński)
 "Królowa" (2004, directed by / realization: Radek "LarryTM" Grabiński)
 "Lunar" (2005, directed by: no data)
 "Nocarz" (2010, directed by: Stanisław Mąderek)
 "Nie tylko gra" (2010, directed by: Stanisław Mąderek)
 "Ogród półcieni" (2010, directed by: no data)

References

External links

Closterkeller official website

Polish gothic rock groups
Polish alternative rock groups
Metal Mind Productions artists
Musicians from Warsaw